The Oymyakon Plateau is a mountain plateau in the Sakha Republic, Far Eastern Federal District, Russia.

The Oymyakon Plateau is one of the areas of Yakutia where kigilyakhs are found.

Geography  
The Oymyakon Plateau is located in the eastern Sakha Republic, in the upper course of the Indigirka River. Together with the Yana Plateau to the north, and the Elgi Plateau to the northwest, it is part of the Yana—Oymyakon Highlands. It  The plateau is limited by the Chersky Range to the east and by the Suntar-Khayata and the Tas-Kystabyt range of the Verkhoyansk Range to the west, connecting both mountain regions.

Climate and flora
The elevation of the plateau surface has two clearly delimited zones and in the intermontane basins, frosty air is trapped in the winter creating inversions. This leads to an average nighttime temperature in January of about -50° C in some areas. 

See also
Oymyakon town

References

External links
Physiogeography of the Russian Far East
Oymyakon Ring Structure in the North-Eastern Siberia
Plateaus of the Sakha Republic
Chersky Range